Jenerrie Harris is an American women's basketball coach and former player.

Career
She was the head coach of the UMass Lowell River Hawks women's basketball team, which plays in the America East Conference, from being hired on June 26, 2014, until March 5, 2018, when her contract was not renewed. Prior to being hired by the River Hawks, Harris was an assistant coach with the Navy Midshipmen women's basketball program. She also an assistant coach at Longwood University and Wright State University.

Harris played college basketball under Bernadette Mattox with the Kentucky Wildcats women's basketball team. At Kentucky, she was originally a walk-on but eventually earned a scholarship. She graduated in 2004 with a Bachelor of Arts in sociology. She is originally from Muskegon, Michigan.

Head coaching record

References

External links
  Official Biography, UMass Lowell River Hawks

Year of birth missing (living people)
Living people
UMass Lowell River Hawks women's basketball coaches
Wright State Raiders women's basketball coaches
Longwood Lancers women's basketball coaches
Sportspeople from Muskegon, Michigan
Basketball players from Michigan
Kentucky Wildcats women's basketball players
American women's basketball coaches
American women's basketball players